Thomas Wingfield may refer to:

Thomas Wingfield (MP for Sandwich) (died c.1550), MP for Sandwich, 1529, 1536
Thomas Maria Wingfield (died 1557), MP for Huntingdon, 1553,1554 and Huntingdonshire, 1555
Tom Wingfield, character in The Glass Menagerie
Thomas Wingfield, character in Montezuma's Daughter

See also